Nama or Nema is an island and municipality in the state of Chuuk, Federated States of Micronesia.

It is a 1.5 km long and 0.5 km wide island part of the Eastern Islands or Upper Mortlock Islands group, located about 60 km to the ESE of Chuuk and 13 km NW of Losap. Nama is densely populated despite its small size. It had 995 inhabitants in the 2000 census.

Climate

Has a Tropical monsoon climate (Köppen climate classification:Aw) that border on a hot desert climate.

References

External links
Report of the German South Pacific Expedition 1908-1910
Polynesia-Micronesia Biodiversity Hotspot

Municipalities of Chuuk State